The 1945 South Dakota Coyotes football team was an American football team that represented the University of South Dakota as an independent during the 1945 college football season. In its first season under head coach Grant Heckenlively, the team compiled a 0–4 record and was outscored by a total of 92 to 0. The team played its home games at Inman Field in Vermillion, South Dakota.

Schedule

References

South Dakota
South Dakota Coyotes football seasons
South Dakota Coyotes football
College football winless seasons